Allegra Denton (born July 27, 1986) is a Canadian former child actress most notable for her role in the TV movie Hidden in America.

Filmography

External links 

1986 births
Living people
Canadian child actresses
Actresses from Toronto
Canadian television actresses